ZW10 interactor (Zwint-1) is a protein that in humans is encoded by the ZWINT gene.

Function 

Zwint-1 is clearly involved in kinetochore function although an exact role is not known. It interacts with ZW10, another kinetochore protein, possibly regulating the association between ZW10 and kinetochores. The encoded protein localizes to prophase kinetochores before ZW10 does and it remains detectable on the kinetochore until late anaphase. It has a uniform distribution in the cytoplasm of interphase cells. Alternatively spliced transcript variants encoding different isoforms have been found for this gene.

Interactions 

ZWINT has been shown to interact with MIS12.
ZWINT has also been shown to interact with RAB3C

References

Further reading

External links